Stocker Brook is a  stream located in western New Hampshire in the United States. It is a tributary of the North Branch of the Sugar River, part of the Connecticut River and Long Island Sound drainage basin.

The brook begins at Cranberry Pond in the town of Croydon, New Hampshire, and flows north, through Stocker Pond, to a junction with Bog Brook in the town of Grantham. The brook turns west, passes the small village of East Grantham, and reaches the North Branch of the Sugar River after another mile, at the main village of Grantham. Stocker Brook is subject to the New Hampshire Comprehensive Shoreland Protection Act for the portion downstream of Bog Brook.

See also

List of rivers of New Hampshire

References

Rivers of New Hampshire
Tributaries of the Connecticut River
Rivers of Sullivan County, New Hampshire